Statistics of Belgian First Division in the 1927–28 season.

Overview

It was contested by 14 teams, and Beerschot won the championship.

League standings

Results

Relegation play-offs

References

Belgian Pro League seasons
Belgian First Division, 1927-28
1927–28 in Belgian football